Mario Landolfi (born 6 June 1959) is an Italian politician, served as a member of the parliament and minister of communications.

Early life
Landolfi was born in Mondragone, the province of Caserta, on 6 June 1959.

Career
Landolfi was a council member of Mondragone beginning in 1983. He became a member of the Italian parliament in June 2001, being part of the National Alliance party. In addition, Landolfi served as the spokesman of the AN. He was a Member of the Chamber of Deputies from 1994 to 2013. He served as the member of different parliamentary commissions. He was appointed Minister of communications to the cabinet led by prime minister Silvio Berlusconi in a reshuffle on 23 April 2005, replacing another AN deputy Maurizio Gasparri in the post. On 17 May 2006, Landolfi's term ended, and Paolo Gentiloni became the new minister of communications.

Landolfi was appointed president of the state television watchdog, Commissione vigilanza, after leaving office in 2006.

References

External links

1959 births
Living people
People from the Province of Caserta
Italian Social Movement politicians
National Alliance (Italy) politicians
The People of Freedom politicians
Government ministers of Italy
Deputies of Legislature XII of Italy
Deputies of Legislature XIII of Italy
Deputies of Legislature XIV of Italy
Deputies of Legislature XV of Italy
Deputies of Legislature XVI of Italy
Politicians of Campania